Cirrhimuraena yuanding is an eel in the family Ophichthidae (worm/snake eels). It was described by Tang Wen-Qiao and Zhang Chun-Guang in 2003. It is a subtropical, marine eel which is known from the East China Sea, in the northwestern Pacific Ocean. Males can reach a maximum total length of 52 centimetres.

The species epithet refers to Professor Zhu Yuang-Ding, the leading authority on ichthyology and fishery science in China.

References

Ophichthidae
Taxa named by Tang Wen-Qiao
Taxa named by Zhang Chun-Guang
Fish described in 2003